Candidatus philologiae (male) or Candidata philologiae (female), often abbreviated cand.philol. is an academic degree in Arts and Letters at Danish and Norwegian universities.

In Norway, the degree usually required six years of study at the time it was abolished (2007). It is considered an entry-level scientific degree for careers in academia (qualifying for positions as assistant professor or universitetslektor), as doctorates traditionally are awarded at a later stage in the career to senior academics.

Master's degrees
Academic degrees of Norway